Brinker International, Inc. (or simply Brinker) is an American multinational hospitality industry company that owns Chili's and Maggiano's Little Italy restaurant chains. Founded in 1975 and based in Dallas, Texas, Brinker currently owns, operates, or franchises 1,672 restaurants under the names Chili's Grill & Bar and Maggiano's Little Italy worldwide.

History

 1975: Larry Lavine opens the first Chili's Grill & Bar in Dallas, Texas.
 1976: The company is renamed Chili's, Inc..
 1983: Norman E. Brinker takes over Chili's, Inc. and takes the company public.
 1988: The first Romano's Macaroni Grill opens in Leon Springs, Texas.
 1991: Chili's, Inc. is renamed Brinker International, Inc. (Brinker).
 1992: Brinker reaches an agreement with Pac-Am Food Concepts to expand the Chili's brand to the Far East.
 1995: Brinker establishes a strategic partnership with Lettuce Entertain You Enterprises. In August, the company completed the acquisition of Maggiano's.
 2000: Norman Brinker steps down as company chairman.
 2005: Brinker announces international expansion plans. Brinker also sells off the Corner Bakery Cafe concept.
 2008: In December, Brinker sells a majority stake of Romano's Macaroni Grill to Mac Acquisition LLC, an affiliate of Golden Gate Capital.
 2009: Norman Brinker passes away on June 9.
 2010: In June, Brinker sells On the Border Mexican Grill & Cantina to OTB Acquisition LLC, also an affiliate of Golden Gate Capital.
 2012:  In May, the Supreme Court of California issued its much-awaited decision in Brinker Restaurant Corp. v. Superior Court. The Brinker decision gave important guidance to employers regarding meal breaks, rest periods, and class certification.
 2013: On February 7, 2013, Brinker announced the election of Wyman Roberts to its board of directors. Roberts served as CEO and President of Brinker International, and President of Chili's Grill & Bar until his retirement in June of 2022. Roberts' Brinker tenure includes his role as President of Chili's since 2009. Previously, Roberts also served as Brinker's Chief Marketing Officer and President of the Maggiano's Little Italy brand.

Restaurants

Brinker International owns, operates, and franchises the Chili's Grill & Bar, Maggiano's Little Italy and It's Just Wings  restaurant concepts. They also have a minority stake in Mac Acquisition LLC, the owners of Romano's Macaroni Grill as of 2008.

See also

 Bloomin' Brands
 Darden Restaurants
 Dine Brands Global

References

External links
 
 Official website
 Brinker International SEC Filings

Companies listed on the New York Stock Exchange
Companies based in Dallas
Hospitality companies established in 1975
Restaurants established in 1975
Hospitality companies of the United States
Restaurant groups in the United States
Catering and food service companies of the United States
Multinational companies headquartered in the United States
1975 establishments in Texas
1980s initial public offerings